34th N Lex is an album by Randy Brecker, released through ESC Records on April 22, 2003. In 2004, the album won Brecker the Grammy Award for Best Contemporary Jazz Album.

Reception 

Peter Marsh's review for the BBC was less-than-favorable.

Track listing

Personnel 

 Michael Brecker – tenor saxophone
 Randy Brecker – trumpet, arranger, flugelhorn, producer, engineer, horn arrangements, pre-programming
 David Sanborn – alto saxophone
 Ada Rovatti – tenor saxophone
 Ronnie Cuber – baritone saxophone
 Michael Davis – trombone
 Fred Wesley – trombone
 Chris Minh Doky – bass, electric bass, engineer, acoustic bass
 Gary Haase – bass, guitar, arranger, drums, keyboards, programming, sound effects, producer, engineer, drum programming, percussion programming, vocal effect
 George Whitty – bass, piano, arranger, keyboards, programming, producer, engineer, drum programming, mixing, percussion programming, effects, effects programming
 Chris Taylor – guitar
 Adam Rogers – guitar, engineer
 Clarence Penn – drums
 Zach Danziger – drum programming
 J. Phoenix – vocals
 Joachim Becker – executive producer
 Dae Bennett – engineer
 Phil Pagano – engineer
 Greg Calbi – mastering
 Francois Zalacain – release production

References

2003 albums
Grammy Award for Best Contemporary Jazz Album
Randy Brecker albums